Bulbophyllum keekee is a species of orchid in the genus Bulbophyllum, native to New Caledonia. It is protected in the northern province.

The species epithet, keekee, honours Hugh Shaw MacKee, a botanist who collected for over 30 years in New Caledonia.

Description
This is a tiny plant and when flowering is no greater than 1 cm high. The rounded pseudobulbs are spaced on the rhizome. Despite its tiny size, this plant can cover large areas.

Habitat
The plant lives at altitude, often on Araucarias.

References

External links
The Bulbophyllum-Checklist
The Internet Orchid Species Photo Encyclopedia

keekee
Flora of New Caledonia
Plants described in 1977
Taxa named by Nicolas Hallé